Yellow Creek (previously also known as Linton) is an unincorporated community in Saline Township, Jefferson County, Ohio, United States.

The Linton Post Office was established as Mouth of Yellow Creek Post Office (in Columbiana County) on May 12, 1832, and the name changed to Linton Post Office on March 30, 1855.  The branch was discontinued on September 30, 1901.

References

Unincorporated communities in Jefferson County, Ohio